Christopher Kolade, CON (born 1932), is a Nigerian diplomat and academic.

Early life and education
He was born in Erin – Oke, Osun State, Nigeria, in 1932. He completed his secondar-school education at Government College, Ibadan after which he studied at Fourah Bay College, Freetown, Sierra Leone.

Career
He is a veteran broadcaster and sometime Director–General of the Nigerian Broadcasting Corporation. 
He was Chief Executive and Chairman of Cadbury Nigeria Plc and formerly the Nigerian High Commissioner to the United Kingdom. He was a colonial era Education Officer in Nigeria. Currently, he teaches Corporate Governance and Human Resources Management at Lagos Business School (LBS), and Leadership & Conflict Management at School of Media & Communication (SMC). LBS and SMC are both schools of Pan-Atlantic University, Lagos. Formerly a member of the university's Governing Council, Dr Kolade  was the Pro-Chancellor and Chairman of the Governing Council of Pan-Atlantic University, He is presently the Chancellor of McPherson University, Ogun, Nigeria.

Service
Dr. Kolade has served in many national and international bodies, having been President of 
 The Nigerian Institute of Management (1985–88),
 The Institute of Personnel Management of Nigeria (1988–93),
 The International Institute for Communications (1973–75)
 The World Association for Christian Communication (1975–82).

He received the medal of the Order of St. Augustine from the Archbishop of Canterbury (1981), and is also a Lay Canon of the Cathedral of the Holy Spirit in the Diocese of Guildford.

He was later appointed Chairman of the Subsidy Reinvestment and Empowerment Programme Board by President Goodluck Jonathan of Nigeria on 3 January 2012.

Hobbies
He enjoys reading and playing musical instruments like the piano. He used to love playing tennis but has given that up.

Kolade has promoted business integrity in Nigeria through his chairmanship of organisations such as Integrity Organisation Ltd GTE and The Convention on Business Integrity Ltd GTE.

References

External links

Living people
1932 births
Community activists
Community building
Nigerian Anglicans
Nigerian Christian pacifists
Anglican pacifists
Nigerian diplomats
Academic staff of Pan-Atlantic University
People from Osun State
Government College, Ibadan alumni
Fourah Bay College alumni
Commanders of the Order of the Niger
Nigerian chairpersons of corporations